Rabbit Lake is the second largest uranium milling facility in the western world, and is the longest operating uranium production facility in Saskatchewan. The facility is located approximately 800 km north of Saskatoon, Saskatchewan, on the northeast edge of the uranium rich Athabasca Basin. The closest community is Wollaston Lake, about 40 kilometers by lake or air. Rabbit Lake was the first Canadian mine to offer a seven-days-in/seven-days-out commuter system of staffing.
Access is provided by Highway 905. Production at Rabbit Lake was suspended in April 2016.

Operations 

The Rabbit Lake deposit was discovered in 1968 and production started in 1975 using open-pit mining methods. The Rabbit Lake pit was mined out in 1984. Exploration resulted in the discovery of additional deposits in the area.

The Eagle Point deposit is being mined using underground mining methods. Between 1975 and 2011, Rabbit Lake has produced 186.3 million pounds U3O8.  Recent exploration drilling has extended mine life to 2017.

When the current refurbishments are complete, Rabbit Lake Mill will be positioned to undertake toll milling for future uranium mines in the area. Since an agreement was signed between AREVA and Cameco in late 2011, Rabbit Lake is no longer planned to process Cigar Lake Mine ore when it begins production in 2013, the McClean Lake mill will process all of the ore from that mine.

Reserves

As of December 31, 2013, proven and probable reserves are 1,642,100 tonnes at 0.56% U3O8. (20.3 Million pounds U3O8)

Awards 
The Rabbit Lake mine has been awarded the Canadian Institute of Mining, Metallurgy and Petroleum's John T. Ryan Trophy for the best safety record for metal mines several times.  This award is given to the metal mine with the best safety record for the previous year.
 
National Trophy
1989
2001
Regional Trophy - Prairies and Northwest Territories
2003

Ownership 

100% owned and operated by Cameco Corporation.

See also 
 Uranium mining
 Unconformity uranium deposits
 Cigar Lake Mine 
 Cluff Lake mine 
 Key Lake mine
 McClean Lake mine

References

External links

Uranium mines in Canada
Mines in Saskatchewan
Underground mines in Canada
Surface mines in Canada